Distorsio anus, common name the common distorsio, is a species of medium-sized sea snail, a marine gastropod mollusk in the family Personidae, the Distortio snails.

Description
The size of the shell varies between 33 mm and 100 mm.

Distribution
This marine species occurs in the Red Sea and in the Indo-Pacific (Tanzania, Madagascar, the Mascarene Basin, Mauritius)

References

 Drivas, J.; Jay, M. (1987). Coquillages de La Réunion et de l'Île Maurice. Collection Les Beautés de la Nature. Delachaux et Niestlé: Neuchâtel. . 159 pp.

External links
 

Personidae
Gastropods described in 1758
Taxa named by Carl Linnaeus